Greenville Public Library is a public library at 573 Putnam Pike in the village of Greenville in the town of Smithfield, Rhode Island directly across from the William Winsor School.

History
The Greenville Public Library was founded in 1882 and was  originally located on the Greenville Common near St. Thomas Church and Greenville Baptist Church and served Smithfield and the surrounding towns. In 1883 William Winsor, one of the original Library incorporators, donated the library collection of the Lapham Institute, a former Free Baptist school founded in 1839, to the Greenville Public Library. In 1956 the library moved up the hill from its original downtown Greenville location into a new building onto which two large additions were constructed in the late twentieth century.

See also
East Smithfield Public Library
List of libraries in Rhode Island

References

External links
Official website

Public libraries in Rhode Island